Count Flemming Valdemar Carl Axel of Rosenborg (9 March 1922 – 19 June 2002) was a former Danish prince.

Life
Prince Flemming was the youngest son and child of Prince Axel of Denmark (himself a son of Prince Valdemar of Denmark) and Princess Margaretha of Sweden.

He renounced his rights to the throne and his princely title and style on 14 June 1949 and took the title of Count of Rosenborg. He served in the Royal Danish Navy as a Commander.
Count Flemming of Rosenborg had four children and ten grandchildren.

Marriage
He married Alice Ruth Nielsen (Copenhagen, 8 October 1924 – 25 July 2010) in Copenhagen on 24 May 1949 and had four children:

 Count Valdemar Georg Flemming Kai Axel of Rosenborg (b. Copenhagen 24 January 1950) he married Jane Glarborg on 24 May 1975 and divorced in 1986; they had two children. He married Jutta Beck on 10 December 1988; they had two children.
 Count Birger Valdemar Georg Flemming Kai Axel of Rosenborg (b. Copenhagen, 24 January 1950) he married Minna Benedicta Tillisch on 19 October 1974 and had one daughter. He divorced in 1978 and married secondly Susanne Kristensen on 28 November 1981. They divorced in 1990. He married thirdly Lynne Denise Sharpe on 4 March 2000.
 Count Carl Johan Valdemar Georg Flemming Kai Axel of Rosenborg (b. Copenhagen, 30 May 1952) he married Dorritt Olsen on 3 September 1982 and divorced in 1986; they had one daughter. He married Colette Cabral on 19 November 1994 and divorced in 2004; they had one daughter. He married Lisa Jeanne Stollar on 20 September 2013 and they divorced in 2016. 
 Countess Désirée Märtha Ingeborg of Rosenborg (b. Copenhagen, 2 February 1955); she married Fergus Stewartson Smith on 23 May 1981, they had one daughter, separated in 1984 and divorced in 1987. She married Peter Rindom on 6 February 1988 and they had two sons.

Titles and styles
 9 March 1922 – 24 May 1949: His Highness Prince Flemming Valdemar of Denmark
 24 May 1949 – 19 June 2002: Count Flemming Valdemar of Rosenborg

Ancestry

References

Citations

Bibliography

 

Danish princes
1922 births
2002 deaths
House of Glücksburg (Denmark)
Counts of Rosenborg
People from Stockholm
Disinherited European royalty
Recipients of the Cross of Honour of the Order of the Dannebrog